Norwin may refer to:

 Norwin School District, Pennsylvania, USA
 Norwin, Queensland, a locality in Australia